Brian O'Sullivan is a hurler for Waterford.

Brian or Bryan O'Sullivan may also refer to:

Brian O'Sullivan (Gaelic footballer), see Noel O'Leary
Brian O'Sullivan (swimmer), participated in Swimming at the 2011 European Youth Summer Olympic Festival
Bryan O'Sullivan, Limerick hurler
Bryan O'Sullivan (computer programmer), technical writer, programmer; leading author of the Real World Haskell book

See also
Brian Sullivan (disambiguation)